of January 1914 involved collusion between several high-ranking members of the Imperial Japanese Navy, the British company Vickers, and the German industrial conglomerate of Siemens AG. It was one of several spectacular political scandals of late Meiji and Taishō period Japanese politics, leading to the fall of the cabinet of Yamamoto Gonnohyoe.

Description
The Japanese navy was engaged in a massive expansion program, and many major items (such as advanced warships and weaponry) were still being imported from Europe. Siemens had secured a virtual monopoly over Japanese naval contracts in return for a secret 15% kickback to the Japanese naval authorities responsible for procurement.

In 1914, the British firm of Vickers (via their Japanese agents Mitsui Bussan) offered the Japanese naval authorities a more lucrative deal, involving a 25% kickback, with 40,000 yen for Vice Admiral Matsumoto Kazu, the former Chief of the Navy Technical Department, specifically involving the procurement of the battlecruiser Kongō. When the German headquarters of Siemens found out about the deal, they sent a telegram to their Tokyo office demanding a clarification. An expatriate employee of the Siemens Tokyo office (Karl Richter) stole incriminating documents indicating that Siemens had previously paid a bribe of 1000 pounds sterling to the Japanese navy in return for a wireless contract, sold the documents to the Reuters news agency together with a copy of the telegram and fled back to Germany.

Japanese newspapers, notably the Asahi Shimbun, immediately reported the details of the corruption scandal, and the issue was raised in the Diet by members of the Rikken Doshikai political party. Both the Army and Navy Intelligence Services and the Kempeitai launched investigations.

Another newspaper, Japan Weekly Chronicle, reported that an Admiral Fuji [Fujii Terugoro] of the navy procurement office had confessed to receiving payments from Vickers of a total 210,000 yen in 1911 and 1912 on various occasions. It reminded its readers that whether or not the money was received illegally under Japanese law, it was certainly illegal under the British Corrupt Practices Act of 1906.

Reactions
Large-scale demonstrations erupted in Tokyo in early February 1914, which turned violent on 10 February and 14 February. Public opinion was further outraged when it was revealed the massive scope of the naval expansion program would have left room for little else in the government budget and that the government was, therefore, planning to raise taxes. Although Prime Minister Yamamoto was not directly implicated and took steps to dismiss naval officers in charge of procurement and shipbuilding, public dissatisfaction continued to grow, and he was challenged to explain the bribery allegations before the House of Peers.

After both houses of Diet refused to pass the 1914 Navy budget, Yamamoto resigned on 24 March 1914, bringing down his entire cabinet with him. Given that Yamamoto was also an officer of the Japanese Navy, a court martial demoted Yamamoto and the Minister of the Navy, Saito Makoto, both of whom had previously held the rank of Admiral. Subsequent court martials sentenced several leading members of the navy procurement department to prison sentences, issued heavy fines to Vickers and Siemens, and banned both companies from future participation in contracts.

Aftermath
With the start of World War I a couple of weeks later, Vickers was asked to restart production on the Kongō, and the men involved were all pardoned and rehabilitated.

The Daily Telegraph newspaper edition of 21 January 1914 reported that Karl Richter had been arrested in Germany for his theft of the incriminating papers, and sentenced to two years in prison.

See also 
 Siemens Greek bribery scandal of 2008

References

Notes

Politics of the Empire of Japan
1914 in Japan
Corruption in Japan
Political scandals in Japan
Military scandals
Weapons trade